The Echo Jazz (stylized as ECHO JAZZ) was a German music prize, an Echo Music Prize for personalities and production of jazz.

The awards had been given in 30 categories, including ensemble of the year, male and female singer of the year, record label, and lifetime achievement. In 2012, the criteria for entry included album release date and "two outstanding reviews from music journalists." Conductor Claus Ogermann was given the ECHO Jazz Lifetime Achievement Award in 2012. Awards were decided by a 12-member jury based on critical and commercial appeal. 

Echo Jazz was disestablished in 2018.

Jury 
 Christiane Böhnke-Geisse
 Ralf Dombrowski
 Stefan Gerdes (NDR)
  (C.A.R.E. Music Group)
  (WDR)
  (Karsten Jahnke Konzertdirektion)
 Astrid Kieselbach (Universal Music)
  (ACT Music)
 Stefanie Marcus (Traumton Records & Jazz- & World Partner)
 Wilma Rehberg (Sony Music)
  (Enja Records)

Winners

2017 
 International Winners
 Ensemble: Branford Marsalis Quartet, Upward Spiral, (Okeh/Sony Music) 
 Singer: Norah Jones, Day Breaks, (Blue Note/Universal Music)
 Instrumentalists
 Piano/keyboards: Kenny Barron, Book Of Intuition, (Impulse/Universal Music)
 Saxophone/woodwinds: Émile Parisien, Sfumato, ACT Music
 Drums/percussion: Antonio Sanchez, The Unity Sessions, (Nonesuch/Warner Music)
 Brass: Cuong Vu, Cuong Vu Trio Meets Pat Metheny, (Nonesuch/Warner Music)
 Guitar: Charlie Hunter, Everybody Has A Plan Until They Get Punched In The Mouth, (Ground Up/Universal Music)
 Bestseller: Singer Gregory Porter, Take Me To The Alley, (Blue Note/Universal Music)
 
 National Winners
 Ensemble: Joachim Kühn New Trio, Beauty & Truth, ACT Music 
 Singer: Lucia Cadotsch, Speak Low, yellowbird 
 Instrumentalists
 Piano/keyboards: Michael Wollny, Tandem, ACT Music 
 Saxophone/woodwinds: Daniel Erdmann, Daniel Erdmann's Velvet Revolution, BMC
 Drums/percussion: Diego Piñera, My Picture, Octason Records 
 Bass/bassguitar: Eva Kruse, On The Mo, Redhorn Records 
 Bass: Lars Danielsson, Sun Blowing, ACT Music 
 Brass: Frederik Köster, Canada, Traumton Records 
 Guitar: Arne Jansen, Nine Firmaments, Traumton Records 
 Special instruments: Vincent Peirani, Tandem, Act Music
 Large ensemble: Marius Neset & London Sinfonietta, Snowmelt, ACT Music 
 Newcomer: Anna-Lena Schnabel,  Books, Bottles & Bamboo, enja  
 Special awards: Arne Reimer for American Jazz Heroes, E.S.T. Symphony

See also 
 Echo Klassik

References

External links 
  (archived)

Jazz awards
German music awards
2018 disestablishments in Germany
Awards disestablished in 2018